The Albany Giants were a minor league Negro league baseball team. They played in the city of Albany, Georgia as a member of the Negro Southern League during 1926.

References
Loverro, Thom. The Encyclopedia of Negro League Baseball. New York:Facts on File, Inc., 2003. .

Negro league baseball teams
Professional baseball teams in Georgia (U.S. state)
1926 establishments in Georgia (U.S. state)
1926 disestablishments in Georgia (U.S. state)
Baseball teams established in 1926
Baseball teams disestablished in 1926
Sports in Albany, Georgia
Defunct baseball teams in Georgia